Karaikal railway station (station code: KIK) is a railway terminus, situated in the town of Karaikal in the Union Territory of Puducherry, India.

Location and layout
The railway station is located on Railway station road off the East Coast Road (ECR) and the Karaikal Bypass Road.

Peralam–Karaikal line 

Currently the station is the terminal point on the Tiruchirapalli–Karaikal branch line and has three platforms. Until 1987 there was a 23 km metre-gauge branch line westwards, connecting Karaikal with Peralam, which was later dismantled. Since then there have been persistent demands from various quarters for the revival of this line. In June 2019 tenders were floated for the restoration of this route, expecting to complete the project by March 2024.

Operations

Express trains

List of passenger trains

References

External links
 

Trichy railway division
Railway stations in Karaikal district
Transport in Karaikal